Sugar Grove is a village in Fairfield County, Ohio, United States. The population was 426 at the 2010 census.

History
Sugar Grove was named for a grove of sugar maple near the original town site.

Geography
Sugar Grove is located at  (39.626620, -82.548519).

Demographics

2010 census
As of the census of 2010, there were 426 people, 155 households, and 123 families living in the village. The racial makeup of the village was 98.1% White, 1.4% Native American, and 0.5% from two or more races. Hispanic or Latino of any race were 0.5% of the population.

There were 155 households, of which 50.3% had children under the age of 18 living with them, 47.7% were married couples living together, 25.2% had a female householder with no husband present, 6.5% had a male householder with no wife present, and 20.6% were non-families. 18.1% of all households were made up of individuals, and 4.5% had someone living alone who was 65 years of age or older. The average household size was 2.75 and the average family size was 3.00.

The median age in the village was 34.8 years. 30.8% of residents were under the age of 18; 9.3% were between the ages of 18 and 24; 27.2% were from 25 to 44; 26% were from 45 to 64; and 6.6% were 65 years of age or older. The gender makeup of the village was 50.2% male and 49.8% female.

2000 census
As of the census of 2000, there were 448 people, 162 households, and 121 families living in the village. The population density was 2,182.1 people per square mile (823.7/km). There were 171 housing units at an average density of 832.9 per square mile (314.4/km). The racial makeup of the village was 99.55% White, and 0.45% from two or more races. Hispanic or Latino of any race were 0.67% of the population.

There were 162 households, out of which 41.4% had children under the age of 18 living with them, 55.6% were married couples living together, 15.4% had a female householder with no husband present, and 24.7% were non-families. 22.8% of all households were made up of individuals, and 9.9% had someone living alone who was 65 years of age or older. The average household size was 2.77 and the average family size was 3.17.

In the village, the population was spread out, with 32.8% under the age of 18, 8.9% from 18 to 24, 28.3% from 25 to 44, 18.5% from 45 to 64, and 11.4% who were 65 years of age or older. The median age was 32 years. For every 100 females there were 92.3 males. For every 100 females age 18 and over, there were 88.1 males.

The median income for a household in the village was $39,107, and the median income for a family was $42,500. Males had a median income of $32,813 versus $22,083 for females. The per capita income for the village was $14,547. About 6.1% of families and 6.0% of the population were below the poverty line, including 8.4% of those under age 18 and 4.2% of those age 65 or over.

Arts and culture
In May 2012, Sugar Grove hosted the inaugural Dude's Weekend celebration. In July 2013 the 2nd annual Dude's Weekend was held in Sugar Grove. Both were attended by Josiah Ryan.

References

External links
 Village website
  Fairfield County Visitors & Convention Bureau

Villages in Fairfield County, Ohio
Villages in Ohio